Sekstet is a 1963 Danish film directed by Annelise Hovmand. The film was selected as the Danish entry for the Best Foreign Language Film at the 37th Academy Awards, but was not accepted as a nominee.

Cast
 John Kelland as Peter
 Ghita Nørby as Lena
 Axel Strøbye as Robert, Elaines man
 Ingrid Thulin as Elaine
 Hanne Ulrich as Rachel
 Ole Wegener as John

See also
 List of submissions to the 37th Academy Awards for Best Foreign Language Film
 List of Danish submissions for the Academy Award for Best Foreign Language Film

References

External links

1963 films
1960s Danish-language films
Films directed by Annelise Hovmand
Danish black-and-white films